This is a list of earthquakes in 1974. Only magnitude 6.0 or greater earthquakes appear on the list. Lower magnitude events are included if they have caused death, injury or damage. Events which occurred in remote areas will be excluded from the list as they wouldn't have generated significant media interest. All dates are listed according to UTC time. Maximum intensities are indicated on the Mercalli intensity scale and are sourced from United States Geological Survey (USGS) ShakeMap data. Activity was once again below average with 11 events reaching magnitude 7+. The largest came in October in Peru when a magnitude 7.6 earthquake struck Lima. Other magnitude 7.0+ events shook the Caribbean, China and the southwest Pacific Islands. Two events dominated the 25,000 deaths during 1974. China was struck by a magnitude 6.8 event in May with upwards of 20,000 deaths. At the end of the year, Pakistan was struck by a modest 6.2 magnitude earthquake causing 5,300 deaths. Gabon in central Africa was hit by a rare earthquake in September.

Overall

By death toll 

 Note: At least 10 casualties

By magnitude 

 Note: At least 7.0 magnitude

Notable events

January

February

March

April

May

June

July

August

September

October

November

December

References

1974
 
1974